Elena Shaddow is an American singer and actress. She is originally from Chagrin Falls, Ohio.

Biography
Shaddow attended New York University, graduating with a music degree.

She has performed on Broadway, Off-Broadway, regionally, in national tours, and in London.

Her Broadway credits include Les Misérables, Sweet Smell of Success, Nine, Fiddler on the Roof,  The Woman in White and The Visit.

She has performed twice at the Tony Awards, on The Today Show, and on The Rosie O'Donnell Show. She can be heard on the recordings of Illyria, Carols for a Cure, the new Broadway cast recording of Nine, the original cast recording of The Water Coolers, and on the original cast recording of Sweet Smell of Success.

She has been nominated twice for a Helen Hayes Award for Best Actress, once for her work in Senor Discretion Himself at Arena Stage (2005) and once for the national tour of The Light in the Piazza (2007, Outstanding Lead Actress, Non-Resident Production).

She starred as Anne Dindon in the 2010 Tony-winning revival of La Cage aux Folles in 2010–2011. In August 2013, she was in the world premiere of Jason Robert Brown's new musical, The Bridges of Madison County at the Williamstown Theatre Festival, starring alongside Steven Pasquale.

Tours
She toured as Clara Johnson in Adam Guettel's The Light in the Piazza in the 2006 US national tour before leaving in 2007 and being replaced by Katie Rose Clarke. She toured as Anna in the US tour of the Lincoln Center production of The King and I in 2018.

Personal
Shaddow and Michael Harrington were married on October 24, 2004. The two met as students at New York University. Their child, a girl was born in 2008.

Career
Broadway
Source: Playbill 

Cosette in Les Misérables (1987)
Susan in Sweet Smell of Success (2002)
Claudia in Nine (2003)
Hodel in Fiddler on the Roof (2004)
Laura Fairlie in The Woman in White (2005)
Anne Dindon in La Cage aux Folles (April 6, 2010 – April 4, 2011)
Ottilie Schell in 'The Visit (2015)

National Tour
Clara in The Light in the Piazza (Helen Hayes Award Nomination) (2006–2007)
Anna in The King and I (2018)

London
Magnolia in Show Boat at Royal Albert Hall (2006)

Off-Broadway
Brooke in The Water Coolers (2002)Hernandez, Ernio; Jones, Kenneth. "Big Names Back Off-Bway Workplace Revue, The Water Coolers, Starting Sept. 27 in NYC" Playbill, September 6, 2002

Regional
Sara Brown in Guys and Dolls at Bucks County Playhouse (2017)
Cinderella in Into the Woods at The Muny
Maria in The Sound of Music at Paper Mill Playhouse (2012)
Lili in Carnival! at Paper Mill Playhouse
Cecily in The Importance of Being Earnest at Shakespeare Theatre of New Jersey
Hodel in Fiddler on the Roof at North Carolina Theatre
Viola in Illyria at Shakespeare Theatre of New Jersey (2004)
Lupita in Senor Discretion Himself (World Premiere) at Arena Stage (Helen Hayes Award Nom.)
Eliza Doolittle in My Fair Lady at North Carolina Theatre (2004)
Maria in West Side Story at North Shore Music Theatre (2003)
Meg in A Christmas Carol at North Shore Music Theatre
Kathie in The Student Prince at North Shore Music Theatre

Readings/Workshops
Grazia in Death Takes a Holiday (Maury Yeston, composer)
Lupita in Senor Discretion HimselfJaz in Jaz (a one-woman play)
Edmee in Cheri (the opera) (Original Cast)
Christine in Love Never DiesConcert
Maury Yeston's December Songs, The EncoreThe West Side Story Suites, Albany Symphony OrchestraGloria (Poulenc), Cleveland OrchestraChichester Psalms (Bernstein), Cleveland Orchestra

University (NYU Steinhardt)
Sarah Brown in Guys and DollsMaria in West Side StoryOur Time (Premiere)
Nora in Riders to the SeaBrigadoonThe Memory of All That... RequiemFrom May to DecemberThe Happy Prince''

References

External links
 Elena Shaddow's Official Website
 The Light in the Piazza Official Tour Website
 

Actresses from Ohio
American women singers
American musical theatre actresses
Year of birth missing (living people)
Living people
People from Chagrin Falls, Ohio
New York University alumni
21st-century American women